Skidby Windmill is a Grade II* listed windmill at Skidby near Beverley, in the East Riding of Yorkshire, England.

Originally built in 1821, the mill was further extended to its current 5 stories in 1870. It is powered by 4 sails, 11 metres in length, and was in commercial use until 1966. Between 1954 and 1966 the mill was used for grinding animal feedstuff using newly installed electric rollers but also continued producing stoneground flour, too. The mill was sold to the local council in 1969 for £1 and after being renovated was opened in 1974 as a working museum.  It is the last working English windmill north of the Humber, producing stoneground wholemeal flour from locally grown wheat. The mill is open to visitors all week, milling takes place from Wednesday to Sunday weather permitting. Adjacent warehouses contain the Museum of East Riding Rural Life, including a famous 'Wolds Wagon' built by P. H. Sissons & Sons, which was originally lent to the Beverley Army Museum of transport. P. H. Sissons & Sons were based at Beswick and built wagons from 1854 onwards.

In 2008, work began on the mill to replace some structural members in the cap and fantail.  The work involved the 15 ton cap being removed by a crane; the only time that the cap has been removed since the 1870s.

Further refurbishment started in late-2019, with the removal of the sails and fantail which were transported to Norfolk for restoration. In July 2020, roof and window repairs were to be undertaken followed by painting of the tower which would take three months to complete. The sails and fantail were to be returned to the mill in early 2021.

See also 
 List of windmills in the East Riding of Yorkshire

References

External links

Skidby Windmill
360 degree panoramic photos of the mill

Windmills in the East Riding of Yorkshire
Grade II* listed buildings in the East Riding of Yorkshire
Tower mills in the United Kingdom
Grinding mills in the United Kingdom
Windmills completed in 1821
Mill museums in England
Agricultural museums in England
Museums in the East Riding of Yorkshire